The Greek Basket League Hall of Fame, or HEBA Basketball Hall of Fame is a hall of fame that recognizes and honors the best basketball players and head coaches in the history of Greece's top-tier level professional club league, the Greek Basket League. Players and head coaches are nominated for the honor, by the governing body of the Greek Basket League, the Hellenic Basketball Association (HEBA).

The hall's inaugural class, was inducted on 18 December 2022.

History
The Greek Basket League Hall of Fame's first class was inducted in a ceremony that took place at the Nikos Galis OAKA Indoor Hall, in Marousi, Athens, in December 2022. It took place during the 2022 HEBA Greek All-Star Game weekend. The hall's first class included a total of thirty players and three head coaches.

Inductees

Players
(Listed by induction year, and in alphabetical order)

Head coaches
(Listed by induction year, and in alphabetical order)

See also
College Basketball Hall of Fame
Basketball Hall of Fame
 List of members of the Naismith Memorial Basketball Hall of Fame
 List of players in the Naismith Memorial Basketball Hall of Fame
 List of coaches in the Naismith Memorial Basketball Hall of Fame
FIBA Hall of Fame
 List of members of the FIBA Hall of Fame
EuroLeague Hall of Fame
Italian Basketball Hall of Fame
VTB United League Hall of Fame
French Basketball Hall of Fame
Finnish Basketball Hall of Fame
Australian Basketball Hall of Fame
Philippine Basketball Association Hall of Fame
Women's Basketball Hall of Fame

References

External links
Greek Basket League Hall of Fame official website 
Greek Basket League official website 
Greek Basket League official website 
Greek Basket League Hall of Fame 2022 Class Induction Ceremony 

2022 establishments in Greece
Awards established in 2022
European basketball awards
Basketball in Greece
Basketball museums and halls of fame
Halls of fame in Greece